Ray Condo (May 16, 1950 – April 15, 2004), born Ray Tremblay, was a Canadian rockabilly singer, saxophonist, and guitarist.

Biography
Born Ray Tremblay in Hull, Quebec, Ray grew up in nearby Ottawa, Ontario, the third of five children. Ray's two brothers, William (Billy) and Robert were younger; his two sisters, Eileen and Maureen were older. Condo taught himself to play the guitar at 11 and by the time he was 16 he had co-written and released his first recording, 'If You Only Knew' with a band in the style of the British invasion called The Peasants.

Ray attended an elite vocational fine art & design high school specifically established by the Ontario Ministry of Education for those showing exceptional talent in fine art and design. An intense and rigorous 4-year program, many who started never completed the course but Ray seemed to thrive in this environment. It was during this time that his sister Eileen passed on.  This shook Ray to the core but he continued on, graduating and finding himself on the road, heading west and away from Ottawa. Reaching Vancouver, Ray studied at the Emily Carr Institute of Art and Design. Not feeling all that challenged by their curriculum, after one year he dropped out and found himself drawn to a world he would eventually return to for good ... music! That started with him playing bass in a Vancouver punk rock group called The Secret Vs.

He left for Montreal to paint for a year, but once again got caught up in music, getting together with bassist Clive Jackson, banjoist Chris Dean, violinist Edgar Bridwell, guitarist Eric Sandmark, and drummer Peter Sandmark to form a band called Ray Condo and his Hardrock Goners, named for Hardrock Gunter, an early rock and roll musician. The Hardrock Goners performed a variety of styles, such as rockabilly, jazz, blues, country and western swing. Their first recordings appeared on the Og label's compilations, "It Came From Canada". They then established their own record label, "Crazy Rekkids".

He earned the last name "Condo" from friend Regan O'Connor, who also came up with the name of the band, Ray Condo and his Hardrock Goners.

In 1991, he returned to Vancouver. The Hardrock Goners toured with him for another three years, and then he and his bassist merged in with a group called The Five Star Hillbillies, to create a new group called The Ricochets, named after how much they "bounced around". They made their last album in 2000.

In 2003, Condo suffered from a minor heart attack. A year later, new band member Ian Tiles found Condo dead from a heart attack in his Vancouver apartment.

Discography
1986 – Crazy Date (Ray Condo & his Hardrock Goners) Pipeline Records
1988 – Hot & Cold (Ray Condo & his Hardrock Goners) Crazy Rekkids
1990 – Condo Country (Ray Condo & his Hardrock Goners) Crazy Rekkids
1991 – Condo Country (Ray Condo & his Hardrock Goners) CD version Crazy Rekkids
1991 – Condo Country (Ray Condo & his Hardrock Goners) EP version FURY Records
1993 – Hillbilly Holiday (Ray Condo & his Hardrock Goners) FURY Records
1994 – Come On! (Ray Condo & his Hardrock Goners) FURY Records
1996 – Swing Brother Swing (Ray Condo & his Ricochets) Joaquin Records
1997 – Door to Door Maniac (Ray Condo & his Ricochets) Joaquin Records
2000 – High & Wild (Ray Condo & his Ricochets) Joaquin Records
2004 – Sweet Love on My MInd/Big Dog Little Dog (Ray Condo & his Hardrock Goners/Ray Condo) Crazy Productions
2007 – Top Hits! Party Favourites! (Ray Condo & his Hardrock Goners) Crow-Matic Records
2017 – Hot 'N Cold reissue CD + 3 videos (Ray Condo & His Hardrock Goners) Super Oldies

References

External links
Biography by Carl Wilson on Official Site
Rockabilly Hall of Fame article

Condo Biography
Condo Photo Gallery

Ray Condo Live Review
Mote Magazine Interview
mp3.com biography
Condo Biography

1950 births
2004 deaths
20th-century Canadian male singers
Canadian rock guitarists
Canadian male guitarists
Canadian country singers
Canadian rock singers
Canadian rockabilly musicians
Canadian saxophonists
Male saxophonists
Emily Carr University of Art and Design alumni
Musicians from Gatineau
Musicians from Vancouver
20th-century Canadian guitarists
20th-century saxophonists